Laura Ortman is an American musician from Whiteriver, Arizona who lives in Brooklyn, New York City. She bridges the gap between music and fine art, which can be seen from her inclusion in fine art exhibitions such as the Whitney Biennial.

Early life and education
Ortman was born in Whiteriver, Arizona, United States. Ortman was adopted at birth and grew up in Alton, Illinois. Ortman grew up in a musical family. Her mother, Terri Ortman was a pianist who managed a youth orchestra for 20 years. Her sister played the flute and harp, her brother played the french horn. Her grandmother, Mrs. Hummer was a symphony violinist in Des Moines, Iowa Ortman describes her grandmother as influencing her taste in classical music introducing her to musicians such as Sibelius, Beethoven, Tchaikovsky, Brahms and Bartok. As a teen, Ortman was a part of the St. Louis Youth Symphony. 

She is a full-blooded White Mountain Apache. In 2001, Ortman reconnected with her birth family in Arizona. The timing was significant as it was one month prior to the 9/11 attack in New York, where Ortman was residing and it was also seven months prior to the death of Terri Ortman, her adopted mother.

Ortman has a Bachelor of Fine Arts from the University of Kansas, where she studied drawing, painting, sculpture and performance art.  

In 1997, Ortman moved to New York City. After moving to New York she began doing improvisational music for modern dancers, soon attracting the attention of the New York Native community. While Ortman lives in busy Brooklyn, New York, she enjoys nature and walks in Prospect Park, as well as hiking and camping in upstate New York's Catskill Mountains.

Career
Ortman is a solo performer and collaborative artist. Her practise includes recorded albums, live performances, film and artistic soundtracks. Ortman has collaborated with artists such as Nanobah Becker, Martin Bisi, Raven Chacon, Tony Conrad, Martha Colburn, Jeffery Gibson, Okkyung Lee, Caroline Monnet, and Jock Soto. Ortman plays Apache style violin, piano, electric guitar, keyboards, pedal steel guitar, and sings. She has produced field recordings.

Style
Ortman's practice has a strong connection to visual art, prior to moving to New York, Ortman states: “I used to try to create painting and installation work about being isolated, of being singular," she says. "Then I started making my own music for the installations, to fill them up. Then, at last, I decided that the sound was what was really moving me." She describes her music as "sculpting sound."

Bands
In 2008, Ortman founded the Coast Orchestra, an all-Native American orchestral ensemble. It performed a live soundtrack to Edward Curtis’s film In the Land of the Head Hunters (1914). Curtis' film was the first silent feature film to star an all Native American cast.
band called in Defense of Memory
Stars Like Fleas
The Dust Dive
The Christian Nightmares Tribulation Band

Major performances
2019 Whitney Biennial
imagineNATIVE Film + Media Arts Festival
Whitney Museum of American Art
The National Museum of the American Indian
the Museum of Modern Art
MoMA P.S. 1
Centre Pompidou
Musée d’Art Contemporain de Montréal 
SF MoMA, 
Cathedral of St. John the Divine

Jerome Foundation Project
Laura Ortman received $20,000 in 2017 from the Jerome Foundation to create of a "collaborative collage" an Indigenous New York City Walking Soundtrack, that fused spoken word, song, din, movement, air, whispers and atmosphere, capturing a changing and personal Native American New York experience. She captured atmospheric recordings using the mobile recording unit she created.

Awards and grants
2017 Jerome Foundation Fellowship 
2016 Art Matters Foundation Grant
2016 National Artist Fellowship Native Arts and Culture Foundation
2015 IAIA's Museum of Contemporary Native Arts Social Engagement Resident
2014–2015 Rauschenberg Foundation Residency
FIRST NATIONS COMPOSERS INITIATIVE Common Ground Award Grant

References

External links
 Ortman's webpage

1973 births
Living people
American artists
American classical musicians
People from Arizona
University of Kansas alumni
White Mountain Apache people
Native American singers
21st-century American women artists
American classical violinists
Avant-garde violinists
21st-century violinists
Women violinists
American adoptees
20th-century Native American women
20th-century Native Americans
21st-century Native American women
21st-century Native Americans